The San Pitch River, extending , is the primary watercourse of the Sanpete Valley and drains into the Sevier River in southwestern Sanpete. The river is named for the Ute chief Sanpitch, who also gives his name to the San Pitch Mountains and Sanpete County.

Course
The upper San Pitch River begins north of Milburn near Oak Creek Ridge on the northern Wasatch Plateau and flows south to Moroni. The middle San Pitch River runs from Moroni, where it crosses Utah State Route 132 (SR‑132). The middle San Pitch River runs from SR‑132 to Gunnison Reservoir. The lower San Pitch River flows from Gunnison Reservoir to where it meets the Sevier River, west of Gunnison.

See also

 List of rivers of Utah

References

External links

 YouTube video showing the restoration of degraded sections of the San Pitch River

Rivers of Sanpete County, Utah
Rivers of the Great Basin
Rivers of the Rocky Mountains
Rivers of Utah